Ithavaram  is a village in Nandigama mandal in NTR district, Andhra Pradesh, India.

References

Villages in NTR district